The Human Rights Act 1993 is an Act of the Parliament of New Zealand that deals with discrimination. It was a consolidation and amendment of the Race Relations Act 1971 and the Human Rights Commission Act 1977. It came into force on 1 February 1994. The Act governs the work of the New Zealand Human Rights Commission.

Legislative features
The act outlawed discrimination on a wide variety of grounds, including:

 Sex (including pregnancy and childbirth)
 Marital status
 Religious belief
 Ethical belief
 Colour
 Race
 Ethnic or national origins
 Disability
 Age
 Political opinion
 Employment status
 Family status
 Sexual orientation

There are a significant number of caveats, including "genuine occupational qualification,"  "domestic employment in a private household," "to preserve reasonable standards of privacy," "national security" and "organised religion."

The Act does not explicitly prohibit discrimination on the basis of gender identity, and the New Zealand Human Rights Commission, supported by the government's legal office, has accepted complaints of discrimination based on gender identity on the ground of sex for many years. However, the decision to interpret the prohibition of discrimination on the ground of sex to cover discrimination based on gender identity is easily reversed. But an important dimension of the exercise undertaken by the Commission in New Zealand was toward the empowerment of trans people, referencing the Yogyakarta Principles. In effect the commission was responding to one of the Yogyakarta Principles' Additional Recommendations to national human rights institutions that integrate the promotion of human rights of persons of diverse sexual orientations and gender identities into their work.

See also
 Human rights in New Zealand
 New Zealand Bill of Rights Act 1990
 LGBT rights in New Zealand

References

External links
Text of the Act

Statutes of New Zealand
1993 in New Zealand law
Human rights in New Zealand
Human rights legislation
National human rights instruments